The Vermilion Block 380 A Platform is a fixed offshore platform located in  of water approximately  off the Louisiana coast in the Gulf of Mexico.  The platform was originally installed as an oil and gas drilling and production platform in early 1980.

Mariner Energy 
The platform was owned by Mariner Energy, Inc., an oil and gas exploration company based in One Briar Lake Plaza in Westchase, Houston, Texas.  In 2010, Apache Corporation bought Mariner Energy for $2.7 billion.  The acquisition was completed on November 10, 2010.

Design 
As viewed from the surface, the platform appears to be of a traditional four-pile design. However, the design incorporates four exterior skirt piles in order to provide additional stability at the base. These skirt piles do not extend all of the way from the mudline to the water surface.

Location 

Explosion 
The rig exploded and caught on fire on September 2, 2010. The platform was off-line for maintenance at the time the incident occurred. Thirteen workers were occupying the platform at the time of the explosion. All of the workers were rescued from the ocean, with one person sustaining injuries. The rescue vessel Crystal Clear rescued the crew members, all of whom wore type I life jackets at the time of rescue. All went to a hospital in Houma, Louisiana.

See also 
 Deepwater Horizon

References

External links 
 Gulf platform explodes in flames, 13 rescued, USA Today

Drilling rigs
Natural gas infrastructure in the United States
Oil platform disasters in the United States
2010 disasters in the United States
Disasters in Louisiana
2010 industrial disasters